Barryton is a village in Mecosta County in the U.S. state of Michigan. The population was 355 at the 2010 census.  The village is located in Fork Township on M-66.  It was established in 1894.

History 
The village of Barryton was established in 1894

In 2020, a petition was started to dissolve the village of Barryton. The petition gained enough signatures to be placed on the ballot for the 2020 election. The measure was subsequently defeated. If it had succeeded, it would have been the first village to ever voluntarily disincorporate in the State of Michigan.

Geography

Major highway 

  runs north-south through the village of Barryton.

Demographics

2010 census
As of the census of 2010, there were 355 people, 154 households, and 89 families residing in the village. The racial makeup of the village was 98.0% White, 0.3% African American, 0.3% Native American, 0.3% Asian, and 1.1% from two or more races. Hispanic or Latino of any race were 0.6% of the population.

There were 154 households, of which 26.0% had children under the age of 18 living with them, 39.0% were married couples living together, 13.6% had a female householder with no husband present, 5.2% had a male householder with no wife present, and 42.2% were non-families. 39.6% of all households were made up of individuals, and 20.1% had someone living alone who was 65 years of age or older. The average household size was 2.31 and the average family size was 2.92.

The median age in the village was 41.2 years. 22% of residents were under the age of 18; 13.7% were between the ages of 18 and 24; 19.7% were from 25 to 44; 21.1% were from 45 to 64; and 23.4% were 65 years of age or older. The gender makeup of the village was 48.7% male and 51.3% female.

2000 census
As of the census of 2000, there were 381 people, 159 households, and 104 families residing in the village. The racial makeup of the village was 95.28% White, 1.84% African American, 0.79% Native American, and 2.10% from two or more races. Hispanic or Latino of any race were 1.57% of the population.

There were 159 households, out of which 31.4% had children under the age of 18 living with them, 45.3% were married couples living together, 13.8% had a female householder with no husband present, and 34.0% were non-families. 28.9% of all households were made up of individuals, and 17.0% had someone living alone who was 65 years of age or older.  The average household size was 2.39 and the average family size was 2.90.

In the village, the population was spread out, with 28.6% under the age of 18, 7.3% from 18 to 24, 23.6% from 25 to 44, 21.0% from 45 to 64, and 19.4% who were 65 years of age or older.  The median age was 38 years. For every 100 females, there were 95.4 males.  For every 100 females age 18 and over, there were 83.8 males.

The median income for a household in the village was $23,333, and the median income for a family was $28,750. Males had a median income of $28,125 versus $21,250 for females. The per capita income for the village was $12,166.  About 15.1% of families and 18.0% of the population were below the poverty line, including 22.8% of those under age 18 and 12.7% of those age 65 or over.

Culture
Barryton is home to the Barryton Lilac Festival. The annual festival is held the first full weekend of June and includes a car show, carnival rides, 5k race, flea market, and parade.

Education
Barryton has one elementary school, Barryton Elementary. The original school was built in 1935 (with a new one completed in 2020) and has about 260 students from preschool to fourth grade. The school is part of Chippewa Hills School District.

References

Notes

Sources

Villages in Mecosta County, Michigan
Villages in Michigan
Populated places established in 1894